Luis Roberto Vera Vargas (born 1952) is a Chilean film director, producer, writer and professor of communications.

Vargas was born in Santiago, Chile. He left the country following the 1973 military coup and came first to Peru as a refugee, and then later to Romania where he studied in film at the University of Bucharest. In 1979, he came as a refugee to Sweden.

He is the father of the Swedish Left Party politician America Vera Zavala.

External links

1952 births
Living people
Chilean film directors
Chilean male writers
Chilean film producers
Refugees in Romania